Formed in 1933, the Vermont Department of Liquor and Lottery is a department of the state government of Vermont responsible for purchasing, distributing, and selling distilled spirits through its agency stores and enforcing Vermont's alcohol and tobacco statutes, with a strong emphasis on limiting youth access.

References

External links 
 Official website

Alcohol monopolies
State alcohol agencies of the United States
State agencies of Vermont